5 Lies is a 2007 Norwegian drama film directed by Lars Daniel Krutzkoff Jacobsen, starring Pia Tjelta, Gard B. Eidsvold and Kim Sørensen. It follows five different people through the course of one day in Oslo.

Synopsis
The film follows five people throughout a single day, showing how their lives intersect.

Cast
 Michalis Koutsogiannakis as Ragnar 
 Pia Tjelta as Maya
 Gard Eidsvold as Torgrim 
 Kim Sørensen as Ulrik
 Jon Skolmen as Ole Gunnar
 Line Verndal as Angela
 Henrik Rafaelsen as Jørn
 Frank Kjosås as Stian
 Ingvild Lien as Rita 
 Naeem Azam as Lege

Production 
5 Lies marked Jacobsen's feature film debut. He was given a budget of approximately NOK 14 million and Jacobsen intended for the film's main message to center around "the terror of good", which he described as "a political correctness where people increasingly have to suppress aspects of themselves to be accepted." Pia Tjelta was confirmed as one of the film's stars and would be portraying a mail order bride.

Release 
5 Lies was released on 15 August 2007 in Norway. It performed poorly at the box office, with NRK reporting that only 15,000 people had purchased tickets as of September of that year.  

Jacobsen responded to the poor reception for 5 Lies, stating that "VG and Dagbladet tried to murder the child at the moment of birth" and calling the Norwegian audience "idiots".

Reception 
Critical reception for 5 Lies was lukewarm. Verdens Gang reviewed the film, writing that it was "extremely ambitious" but also "ran aground". ABC Nyheter gave it 6/10, criticizing it as uneven.

References

External links
 
 5 Lies at Filmweb.no
 5 Lies at Cineuropa

2007 films
2007 drama films
Norwegian drama films